Smith Newell Penfield (April 4, 1837 – January 7, 1920) was an American composer.

Penfield studied at Oberlin College and in New York, and later in Leipzig with Ignaz Moscheles, Carl Reinecke, Ernst Richter, and Moritz Hauptmann.  Back in the United States, he worked as a music teacher in Rochester and founded a Mozart Club and a Conservatory in Savannah.  In 1885, he became President of the Music Teachers National Association.

His compositions included a setting of Psalm 18, an overture, a string quartet, pieces for organ and for piano, choral works, and songs.

External links
 

1837 births
1920 deaths
19th-century classical composers
20th-century classical composers
American male classical composers
American music educators
Oberlin College alumni
People from Oberlin, Ohio
People from Lorain County, Ohio
American Romantic composers
19th-century American composers
20th-century American composers
Educators from Ohio
20th-century American male musicians
19th-century American male musicians